Ion Gheorghe Ionescu (born 5 April 1938) is a Romanian former football striker.

Club career
Ion Gheorghe Ionescu, nicknamed "Puiu" was born on 5 April 1938 in Bucharest, Romania, growing up in the Cotroceni neighborhood. He made his Divizia A debut, playing for Rapid București under coach Ion Mihăilescu on 30 October 1960 in a 2–0 loss against Minerul Lupeni. He spent 8 seasons at Rapid, making a successful couple in the team's offence with Emil Dumitriu, winning two times the top-goalscorer of Divizia A title in the 1962–63 season with 20 goals and in 1965–66 with 24 goals. In the 1966–67 season, under the guidance of coach Valentin Stănescu he helped Rapid win the first league title in the club's history, being the team's top-goalscorer with 15 goals scored in 22 matches. After two years spent in West Germany at Alemannia Aachen, Ionescu came back in Romania to play for Crișul Oradea where he made his last Divizia A appearance on 28 June 1970 in a 0–0 against Dinamo Bacău, afterwards ending his career by playing two seasons at Cercle Brugge, a team he helped promote from the second to the first league. Ion Ionescu played 184 Divizia A matches in which he scored 107 goals, also appearing in 4 matches in which he scored one goal against Trakia Plovdiv which helped Rapid advance to the following round of the 1967–68 European Cup edition where they were eliminated by Juventus.

Transfer at Alemannia Aachen
In October 1967 Rapid played a friendly game against Alemannia Aachen in which Ionescu scored two goals and in December Romania's national team played a friendly against Aachen in which Ionescu scored three goals. These five goals impressed the leaders of the German club who wanted to transfer Ionescu to their team. During Romania's communist era, transfers of Romanian footballers outside the country were rarely allowed, Ionescu had to convince the Romanian Football Federation to allow the transfer and he managed to do so after having a meeting with communist politician Gheorghe Apostol who talked to Leonte Răutu and helped Ionescu receive approval for his transfer in Germany, thus becoming the first Romanian footballer who obtained in the communist regime the right to play abroad. Aachen paid $100,000 and a bus for his transfer and Ionescu made his Bundesliga debut on 17 August 1968 under coach Michael Pfeiffer in a 4–1 away victory against Nürnberg scoring a total of 7 goals in 24 league matches by the end of his first season spent at the club, making a successful couple in the team's offence with Roger Claessen, helping the team finish second in the championship.

International career
Ion Ionescu played 15 games at international level for Romania, making his debut on 23 December 1962 when coach Silviu Ploeșteanu sent him on the field at half-time to replace Cicerone Manolache in a friendly which ended with a 3–1 loss against Morocco. His following three games were at the 1966 World Cup qualifiers. In a friendly against Greece which ended with a 2–1 victory, Ionescu scored his first two goals for the national team. His following three games were at the Euro 1968 qualifiers in which he scored two goals in a 7–0 victory against Cyprus. Ionescu's last game for the national team was a 2–2 against Greece at the 1970 World Cup qualifiers. Ionescu also played 9 games for Romania's Olympic team and participated at the 1964 Summer Olympics in Tokyo where he played four games and scored one goal in a 3–1 victory against Mexico helping the team finish in the 5th place.

International goals
Scores and results list Romania's goal tally first, score column indicates score after each Ionescu goal.

Managerial career
Ion Ionescu started his managerial career in 1978 at Divizia B club, Gloria Buzău which he helped promote by the end of the season to Divizia A where he coached it the full 1978–79 season. He had another experience at Rapid București, afterwards retiring from his coaching activity and working as a lawyer and for a short while as a judge.

Honours

Player
Rapid București
Divizia A: 1966–67
Alemannia Aachen
Bundesliga runner-up: 1968–69
Cercle Brugge
Belgian Second Division: 1970–71

Manager
Gloria Buzău
Divizia B: 1977–78

Individual
Total matches played in Divizia A: 184 matches – 107 goals
Top-goalscorer of Divizia A: 1962–63, 1965–66

Notes

References

External links

1938 births
Living people
Footballers at the 1964 Summer Olympics
Romanian footballers
Romania international footballers
Romanian expatriate footballers
Expatriate footballers in West Germany
Expatriate footballers in Belgium
Romanian expatriate sportspeople in Belgium
Romanian expatriate sportspeople in West Germany
Liga I players
Bundesliga players
Belgian Pro League players
Challenger Pro League players
Olympic footballers of Romania
FC Rapid București players
Alemannia Aachen players
FC Bihor Oradea players
Cercle Brugge K.S.V. players
Romanian football managers
FC Rapid București managers
FC Gloria Buzău managers
Association football forwards
Footballers from Bucharest
FC Rapid București assistant managers